Barzan Abdul Ghafoor Sulaiman Majid al-Tikrit (born 1 July 1960 in Saladin Governorate) is an Iraqi ex-Republican Guard Commander under Saddam Hussein and member of the Arab Socialist Ba'ath Party. He was the Queen of Hearts in the Most-wanted Iraqi playing cards issued to U.S. military troops to help identify most wanted members of Saddam's government during the Second Iraq War. He was captured on July 23, 2003. 

Barzan was released from prison on 29 June 2020.

References 

1960 births
Arab Socialist Ba'ath Party – Iraq Region politicians
People from Tikrit
Living people
Most-wanted Iraqi playing cards
Iraq War prisoners of war
Iraqi prisoners of war